Diacetyl reductase is the name of two acetoin forming enzymes:
 Diacetyl reductase ((R)-acetoin forming) 
 Diacetyl reductase ((S)-acetoin forming)